Lakeport is a city in Gregg County, Texas, United States. The population was 974 at the 2010 census, up from 861 at the 2000 census; in 2020, its population was 976.

Geography

Lakeport is located in southeastern Gregg County at  (32.409544, –94.709010). Texas State Highway 149 (Estes Parkway) forms the northeastern border of the city, and leads north  to Longview and southeast  to Tatum. Texas State Highway 322 passes through the west side of Lakeport, starting at Highway 149 and leading south  to Henderson. The city is bordered to the south by East Texas Regional Airport.

The Sabine River forms part of the northwest border of the city.

Demographics

According to the census of 2000, there were 861 people, 352 households, and 255 families residing in the city. The population density was 555.0 people per square mile (214.5/km2). There were 373 housing units at an average density of 240.5/sq mi (92.9/km2). The racial makeup of the city was 47.27% White, 47.97% African American, 0.58% Native American, 0.23% Asian, 3.37% from other races, and 0.58% from two or more races. Hispanic or Latino of any race were 5.57% of the population.

As of the 2020 United States census, there were 976 people, 410 households, and 326 families residing in the city.

In 2000, the median income for a household in the city was $33,125, and the median income for a family was $45,000. Males had a median income of $35,329 versus $22,250 for females. The per capita income for the city was $18,646. About 9.8% of families and 11.0% of the population were below the poverty line, including 8.9% of those under age 18 and 18.3% of those age 65 or over. In 2020, the median household income grew to $61,500 with a mean household income of $70,444.

Transportation
The East Texas Regional Airport is adjacent to Lakeport at the city's southern boundary.

References

Cities in Texas
Cities in Gregg County, Texas
Longview metropolitan area, Texas